Latisha Chan and Martina Hingis were the defending champions, but Hingis retired from professional tennis at the end of 2017 and Chan chose to prepare for the Asian Games instead.

Lucie Hradecká and Ekaterina Makarova won the title, defeating Elise Mertens and Demi Schuurs in the final, 6–2, 7–5.

Tímea Babos will regain the WTA no. 1 doubles ranking at the end of the tournament as Chan did not defend her title. Kateřina Siniaková was also in contention for the top ranking at the start of the tournament.

Seeds
The top four seeds received a bye into the second round.

Draw

Finals

Top half

Bottom half

References

External links
 Main draw

Women's Doubles